Frederick Gale Ruffner Jr. (August 26, 1926 – August 13, 2014) was an American publisher who is known as the founder of Gale Research.

He died August 12, 2014, at the age of 87.

Publishing career
Ruffner founded Gale Research in 1954 while working as a market researcher for the General Detroit Corporation, a manufacturer of fire extinguishers and fire trucks.

Early Gale publications included the National Directory of Rack Jobbers and the National Directory of Trading Stamp Houses

His first major success was the Encyclopedia of Associations, (originally titled the Encyclopedia of American Associations) in 1956. Beginning with the third edition, the title was changed to the Encyclopedia of Associations.

Other major publications included Contemporary Authors and the Dictionary of Literary Biography.

Ruffner sold Gale to Thomson in 1985.

In 1985, Ruffner founded the publishing company Omnigraphics with his son Peter.

In 1986, Ruffner founded the Literary Landmarks Association to recognize historic sites related to major literary figures and events.

Ruffner was awarded an honorary membership in the American Library Association in 1987.

Military career
Ruffner enlisted in the U.S. Army at the age of seventeen and fought at Saipan and Okinawa during World War II.

He was awarded the Bronze Star Medal for Valor and the Combat Infantryman Badge.

See also 
Encyclopedia of Associations 
Contemporary Authors 
Dictionary of Literary Biography

References

External links
 Gale website
 Omnigraphics website
 "General Fire Extinguishers" at Vintage Fire Extinguishers

American publishers (people)
Ohio State University alumni
1926 births
2014 deaths
United States Army personnel of World War II